Khalij Fars Mahshahr Sport Club (Bashgah-e Varzeshi-e Xalij-e Fârs-e Mahshahr) is a professional football club based in Mahshahr, Khuzestan, Iran actually  playing in the third tier League 2.

Hazfi Cup 
In one of the matches of 2021-22 Hazfi Cup round of 32, the Khalij Fars Mahshahr team scored the first matches and at home with one goal, defeated Havadar team and reached the top 16 teams. They managed to reach the hazfi Cup semi final.

References 

Football clubs in Iran